Nomvelo Sibanda (born 21 November 1996) is a Zimbabwean cricketer who plays for the Zimbabwe women's national cricket team as a left-arm medium bowler. She has previously played for Kei.

In January 2019, Sibanda was named in Zimbabwe's Women's Twenty20 International (WT20I) squad for their five-match series against Namibia. The matches were the first WT20I matches to be played by Zimbabwe since the International Cricket Council (ICC) awarded WT20I status to all of its members in July 2018. She made her WT20I debut on 5 January 2019, for Zimbabwe against Namibia. In October 2021, Sibanda was named in Zimbabwe's Women's One Day International (WODI) squad for their four-match series against Ireland. The fixtures were the first WODI matches after Zimbabwe also gained WODI status from the ICC in April 2021. She made her WODI debut on 5 October 2021, for Zimbabwe against Ireland.

In November 2021, she was named in Zimbabwe's team for the 2021 Women's Cricket World Cup Qualifier tournament in Zimbabwe. In April 2022, she was named in Zimbabwe's squad for the 2022 Capricorn Women's Tri-Series. In the final of the tournament, against Namibia, she became the first bowler for Zimbabwe to take a hat-trick in a WT20I match, and she also took her first five-wicket haul in WT20Is.

References

External links

1996 births
Living people
Sportspeople from Matabeleland South Province
Zimbabwean women cricketers
Zimbabwe women One Day International cricketers
Zimbabwe women Twenty20 International cricketers
Kei women cricketers
Tuskers women cricketers